Rebecca Grant (born Rebecca Helena Grant de Longueuil ca. 1982 in Nottingham) is an English actress and singer, known for her roles as Daisha Anderson on the BBC medical drama Holby City and Heather Irvine on the BBC soap opera Doctors. 

Grant also has a singing career, and is known by the stage name, Rebecca Swing. Through her father, Michael Grant, 12th Baron de Longueuil, Grant is a second cousin twice removed of Elizabeth II of the United Kingdom.

Acting career
Grant recently appeared in Stan Lee's Lucky Man for Sky 1 playing Lakshi Perrera opposite James Nesbitt and Amara Karan. She has taken regular television parts in BBC's Prisoners Wives, Midsomer Murders, ITV's Emmerdale playing Dr. Stamford, Channel 4's Comedy Showcase playing Nila in 'Other People' opposite Martin Freeman, and The Way We Live Now. She has also appeared on the big screen, in Kristina (an Independent Film in which she won best actress at The International Filmmaker Festival of World Cinema), Monsoon Tide (Laidback Films), Flipside and The Other Boleyn Girl. She also appeared in the 2001 film Sticks alongside Justina Machado. She played Yerma in Federico Garcia Lorca's Yerma directed by Emilio Barrachina which is gaining critical acclaim in Spain. Rebecca also recently won Best actress at The London Greek Film Festival for her portrayal of Stavroula in The 13TH by 1066 Productions.

Her stage credits include: Dinner With Saddam at The Menier Chocolate Factory written by Anthony Horowitz and performing opposite Steven Berkoff, Andrew Lloyd Webber's Bombay Dreams; One Flew Over the Cuckoo's Nest starring Christian Slater and directed by Terry Johnson; Tagore's Women by Kali Theatre; The House of Bernarda Alba; Who Is This Jesus?; Bloodwedding; Why Is John Lennon Wearing a Skirt?; Carmen; Roy Hudd's Aladdin; Mahabharata; Burlesque; Twelfth Night; and The Glass Cage.

In her most well known role, as Daisha Anderson, Grant plays a Filipina nurse, but Rebecca is of mixed British, Spanish and Filipino origin. She was also series regular Shaheen Wazir in BBC's second series of Prisoners' Wives and played semi-regular Heather Irvine in BBC One's Doctors.

In 2014, Grant played Princess Aouda in Jules Verne's Around the World in 80 Days written by House of Cards writer Laura Eason, receiving five star reviews up and down the country. She was then cast by Olivier award-winning director Terry Johnson in Seminar for Hampstead Theatre: a play that was previously on Broadway and written by NBC's Smash writer Theresa Rebeck. In 2015, Grant performed in a one-woman play at West Yorkshire Playhouse written by The Vagina Monologues writer Eve Ensler. In 2019, Grant appeared in the Acorn TV series Queens of Mystery as Natasha Young. In October 2022, she returned to Doctors for one episode as Gemma Swinton.

Other acting roles include Showtrial, Some Like It Hot and Safe Space.

Singing career 
Grant has been singing throughout her acting career. At age 16, she was cast as Princess Jasmine in Cornwall's leading Theatre The Hall for Cornwall starring opposite Rick Wakeman and Richard Gauntlett singing Disney favorites such as A Whole New World. In J.B. Priestley's The Glass Cage she sang a French Ballad at the close of the play. In January 2018 she was preselected for a GOYA for her lead role in Emilio Ruiz Barrachina's film 'Yerma' in which she also sang a melody as part of her role.

After a string of regular TV roles (see above) she was scouted by the Jive Aces (UK's Number one Jive Band and Britain's Got Talent semi-finalists) playing a number of UK Jazz Festivals and also appearing with them at London's Iconic Jazz Club; Ronnie Scott's and finally took the stage with them at the Royal Albert Hall opening with Marilyn Monroe's 'I Want To Be Loved By You'. Along the way she had also performed with them for the Queen's Jubilee celebrations at Buckingham Palace in 2012.

In the summer of 2018, Rebecca teamed up with US based Producer, Steve Scrivens to co-produce and star in a newly commissioned Musical Theatre Production being written by BAFTA Award-winning writer, Keith Tutt which is slated to tour the UK in 2020. In the meantime under the management of Scrivens she is currently preparing for a UK Music and Dance show under her Musical Stage Name, Rebecca Swing which will feature music of the 1920/30's Swing and Jazz Period in a 21st Century Electro-Swing style. She is also booked to star in a show produced by multi-award winning Israeli Composer & Musical Producer Tomer Adaddi in Boca Raton, Florida in February/March 2019.

Rebecca is now developing her own music with musician and composer Stephen Large and music producer Andrew Jones and has already tried her hand at penning new songs for Laidback Films production; 'Monsoon Tide' writing the theme song "Wild Wild Woman' and 'Tears out to Dry' with Young Busker of the Year', Jamie West

Personal life
Grant's father Michael Grant, 12th Baron de Longueuil, a doctor, hypnotist and nobleman, is of Anglo-Scots and French-Canadian descent. Her mother Isabel moved from the Philippines to live in Nottingham, England, where Rebecca grew up. She has two older sisters and a brother. Her paternal great-grandmother, Ernestine Bowes-Lyon, was first cousin to the British Queen Mother.

References

External links
 
 Rebecca Grant - The Official Art Website
 Rebecca Grant - The Official Acting Website
Rebecca Swing - The Official Music Website

Living people
1982 births
21st-century English actresses
21st-century English women singers
21st-century English singers
Actors from Nottingham
Bowes-Lyon family
British actresses of Asian descent
English film actresses
English people of Scottish descent
English people of French-Canadian descent
English people of Filipino descent
English soap opera actresses
English television actresses